Roku is a set-top streaming video player.

Roku may also refer to:

 Roku, Iran, a village in Iran
 Roku, the number six in Japanese numerals
 Roku, a character in the animated television series Avatar: The Last Airbender
 Roku, Inc., the electronics company that manufactures the Roku player

See also
 RockYou, an American advertising company